Prelusive is the 2002 independent debut EP by Australian singer–songwriter Sarah Blasko.

A video was made for "Your Way", and the song received a great deal of airplay on youth radio station Triple J.

The EP is called 'Prelusive' "because that means introductory, from the word 'Prelude', which is a musical term meaning a short, independent composition" said Blasko in a 2003 interview. "And so I thought that word really fit because [the EP] is relatively short- only six songs, and it’s independent, and it’s a composition, or a number of compositions."

The EP was re-released by Sarah's new label Dew Process (UMA DEW90062) on March 31, 2003.

Track listing
"Your Way" – 4:04
"Will You Ever Know" – 3:45
"Be Tonight" – 4:59
"Sweet Surrender" – 4:24
"Follow The Sun" – 4:16
"New Religion" – 4:51

Tracks 1 & 2 written by Sarah Blasko & Nicholas Schneider, 3 & 6 written by Sarah Blasko and tracks 4 & 5 written by Sarah Blasko and Hugh Wilson.

Studio crew
 Sarah Blasko - vox, guitar, keyboards
 Nicholas Schneider - guitar, keyboards, programming, flute
 Willem New - bass
 Jeff De Araujo - drums
 Hugh Wilson - keyboards, guitar
Mixed by Steve Francis, mastered by Adam McElnea.

External links
Sarah Blasko's official site
Sarah Blasko fan site
Sarah Blasko Forum
Dew Process Records (Australia)
Low Altitude Records (United States)

2002 debut EPs
Sarah Blasko albums